Lambeth was a civil parish and metropolitan borough in south London, England. It was an ancient parish in the county of Surrey. The parish was included in the area of responsibility of the Metropolitan Board of Works in 1855 and became part of the County of London in 1889. The parish of Lambeth became a metropolitan borough in 1900, following the London Government Act 1899, with the parish vestry replaced by a borough council.

Geography
The ancient parish was divided into the six divisions of Bishop's Liberty, Prince's Liberty, Vauxhall Liberty, Marsh and Wall Liberty, Lambeth Dean and Stockwell Liberty. 

In addition to the historic riverside area of Lambeth, this included Kennington, Vauxhall, Stockwell, Brixton, the western part of Herne Hill, Tulse Hill and West Norwood.

As the population was increasing, in 1824 the ancient parish was subdivided into ecclesiastical districts of Brixton, Kennington, Lambeth Church, Waterloo Road and West Norwood. These districts were adopted for census reporting in 1841 with Lambeth Church and Waterloo Road further subdivided into first and second divisions.

In 1900 some irregular boundaries of the parish were tidied up:
 The Streatham exclave completely surrounded by Camberwell and Lambeth was transferred to Lambeth (population 3,453)
 The Camberwell/Lambeth boundary was tidied up with an exchange of population (approximately 6,000 each way) which had the effect of transferring Myatt's Fields Park to Lambeth

Ecclesiastical parish 
The ancient parish, dedicated to St Mary, was in the Diocese of Winchester until 1877, then the Diocese of Rochester until 1905, and then finally in the Diocese of Southwark. From 1824, as the population of Lambeth increased, a number of new parishes were formed:
 St John the Evangelist, Waterloo in 1824
 St Luke, West Norwood in 1824
 St Mark, Kennington in 1824
 St Matthew, Brixton in 1824
 Holy Trinity, Lambeth in 1841
 St Mary the Less, Lambeth in 1842
 St Michael, Stockwell in 1845
 St Andrew, Waterloo in 1846
 St Thomas, Waterloo in 1846
 All Saints, Waterloo in 1847
 St Barnabas, Kennington South in 1851
 St John the Evangelist, Angell Town Brixton in 1853
 Christ Church, North Brixton in 1856
 Holy Trinity, Tulse Hill in 1856
 St Peter, Vauxhall in 1861
 St Stephen, South Lambeth in 1861
 St Philip in 1864
 St Andrew, Stockwell Green in 1868
 St Saviour, Herne Hill Road in 1868
 St Anne, South Lambeth in 1869
 Emmanuel, Lambeth in 1869
 St Jude, Brixton in 1869
 St John, Kennington 1872
 All Saints, South Lambeth in 1874
 St James, Kennington in 1875
 St Saviour, Brixton Hill in 1876
 St Catherine, Loughborough Park in 1877
 St Paul, Ferndale Road in 1882
 St Matthias, Upper Tulse Hill in 1900
 St Anselm, Kennington Cross in 1901

In addition, as the population of neighbouring areas increased, parts of Lambeth parish were included in new parishes:
 St Paul, Herne Hill in 1845 with parts of St Giles, Camberwell
 St Agnes, Kennington Park in 1874 with parts of St Mary, Newington

Political history
Under the Metropolis Management Act 1855 any parish that exceeded 2,000 ratepayers was to be divided into wards; as such the incorporated vestry of St Mary Lambeth was divided into eight wards (electing vestrymen): No. 1 or North Marsh (18), No. 2 or South Marsh (12), No. 3 or Bishop's (12), No. 4 or Prince's (15), No. 5 or Vauxhall (24), No. 6 or Stockwell (15), No. 7 or Brixton (15) and No. 8 or Norwood (9).

Borough council

The borough council was established in 1900. The metropolitan borough was divided into nine wards for elections: Bishop's, Brixton, Herne Hill, Marsh, Norwood, Prince's, Stockwell, Tulse Hill and Vauxhall.
The borough council was controlled by the Municipal Reform Party (allied to the Conservatives) until 1937, when the Labour Party gained power. Labour retained control until abolition in 1965.

Parliament constituency
For elections to parliament, a borough constituency for Lambeth was established under the Reform Act 1832. Parliamentary boundaries were redrawn in 1885 with the parish divided into four constituencies:
Lambeth, Brixton
Lambeth, Kennington
Lambeth, North
Lambeth, Norwood

In 1950 the borough's representation was reduced to three seats:
Lambeth, Brixton
Lambeth, Norwood
Lambeth, Vauxhall

Town hall
Lambeth Town Hall was built in Brixton in 1906 to 1908 to designs by Septimus Warwick and H. Austen Hall. It replaced the Old Town Hall in Kennington Road. The building is constructed of red brick and Portland stone, with a 41-metre high clock tower. Since 1965 it has formed the headquarters of the successor London Borough.

In the stairwell of the hall is a plaque erected by the Government of Ontario to commemorate the birthplace of John By, who helped create Bytown or Ottawa, Ontario (capital of Canada).

Population and area
The population of the metropolitan borough as recorded at each census was as follows:

Lambeth Vestry 1801–1899

Metropolitan Borough 1900–1961
{| class="wikitable" 
! Year
|| 1901|| 1911 || 1921 || 1931 || 1941 ||1951 || 1961 
|-
! Population || 301,895 || 298,058 || 302,863 || 296,147 ||<ref>The census was suspended for World War II</ref> || 230,240 || 223,763
|}

Coat of arms

When the borough was created in 1900, the corporation adopted a seal which was used in place of a coat of arms. The device was derived from that of the borough's forerunner, Lambeth Vestry. At the base of the seal was a lamb, a play on the name "Lambeth", and a symbol long used to represent the parish. The two shields were those of the Diocese of Canterbury and the Duchy of Cornwall. The first referred to Lambeth Palace, residence of the Archbishop of Canterbury. The second was to show that the Duchy owned estates in the Kennington area of the borough. The design was completed by the cypher of Queen Victoria, and the year of the borough's founding. This device can still be seen in the circular hall of Lambeth Town Hall.

In 1922 the borough obtained an official grant of arms from the College of Arms. The lamb was moved to the crest, on top of the helm. It was transformed into a paschal lamb supporting a pennon of St George. As a number of other crests featured a paschal lamb, a silver and blue wave, for the River Thames, was added. The arms themselves retained references to the Duchy of Cornwall (the black border charged with bezants or gold discs) and the Archbishop of Canterbury (the mitre and crozier). The red cross in the first quarter was taken from the arms of the London County Council, showing that the borough was in the county. The fourth quarter contained a gold and blue chequered pattern, the arms of the de Warennes, Earls of Surrey. This was included to show that Lambeth lay in the county of Surrey until 1889. The ermine patterning in the other quarter was said to stand for "purity and honour".

The motto adopted was Spectemur Agendo, a motto common to several local authorities in England.  Although this is generally rendered in English as Judge us by our deeds, the official translation in Lambeth has traditionally been the more ponderous Let us be regarded according to our conduct.''

On 22 February 1966 the arms were transferred by royal licence to the London Borough of Lambeth. On registration at the College of Arms, two gold stars were added in the second and third quarters to depict the addition of Clapham and Streatham to Lambeth.

Abolition
In 1965 the borough was amalgamated with the Streatham and Clapham parts of the Metropolitan Borough of Wandsworth to form the new London Borough of Lambeth.

References

Further reading
 

Metropolitan boroughs of the County of London
History of the London Borough of Lambeth
1900 establishments in the United Kingdom
1965 disestablishments in the United Kingdom
Districts abolished by the London Government Act 1963